Leyton Grange, in Leyton, east London, is the second most deprived area of the London Borough of Waltham Forest. It include an estate that consists of a 10-storey tower and ten 4-storey courts owned by Forest Homes (see list below).

Leyton Grange is sited in an area of Waltham Forest that overlooks the marshes of the River Lea, east of the city of London.
The Grange was the ancient manor house of Leyton, the name signifying that it was once owned by Stratford Abbey; the first record of it by that name is in 1470. The house was rebuilt in 1720 in the Palladian style to the design of its owner, David Gansel. Leyton Grange was the seat of a branch of the Lane family from 1784 until 1861, when they sold it to the British Land Company who broke it up for development. From approximately 1824 until 1843 the Lanes leased the Grange to William Rhodes, grandfather of Cecil Rhodes.

It now contains a housing estate complex, comprising one 10-storey block and ten 4-storey courts.

 Slade Tower
 Sorenson Court
 Hammond Court
 Hinton Court
 Fitzgerald Court
 Eton Manor Court
 Clewer Court
 Cochrane Court
 Allanson Court
 Underwood Court
 Bechervaise Court

References

External links

Areas of London
Housing estates in the London Borough of Waltham Forest
Leyton